Donbeh may refer to:
 Donbeh, Fars
 Donbeh, Isfahan
 Donbeh-ye Olya, Kerman Province